Rosapoo (English: Rose Flower) is a 2018 Malayalam-language comedy-drama film produced by Shibu Thameens under Thameens Films. The film stars Biju Menon and Neeraj Madhav in the lead roles along with Soubin Shahir, Anjali, Alencier Ley Lopez and  Vijayaraghavan. The film is directed by Vinu Joseph. The film's music is composed by Sushin Shyam. The film was based on a story written by Vinu Joseph. The film portrays the porn movie market that boomed in the 2000–2010 decade.

Plot 
The story is centred around a small village in Kochi. Shajahan is a businessman who is suffering a loss in his brick and mortar business and tries his hand into many small businesses with his friend Ambrose to earn some money. The idea of businesses from agarbatheese to egg and them to porn movie is the idea of their friend Bhanu. Shahjahan had been taking money for all the businesses from money lender Velayudhan for their business ventures. In order to solve thee previous dues he takes further a lot of money from his in the name of a movie. They find an actress and a writer with the help of Sajeer. The movie actress falls in love with Ambrose in between the shoot. Later Shajahan and Ambrose gets cheated by Sajeer as he conspires with the theatre owners to get the whole profit. Shajahan and Ambrose learn of the cheating only after the film becomes a hit.

Cast

Soundtrack 
The original soundtrack is composed, programmed, and arranged by Sushin Shyam.

References

External links 
 

2018 films
2010s Malayalam-language films
Films about pornography
Indian comedy-drama films
Films shot in Kochi
Films scored by Sushin Shyam
Films set in the 2000s